Deirdre O'Brien (born c. 1966) is an American businesswoman and the Senior Vice President of Retail and People at Apple Inc. At Apple, Deirdre oversees a broad range of functions including talent development and Apple University, recruiting, employee relations and experience, business partnership, benefits, compensation, and inclusion and diversity.

In 2019, O'Brien was 32nd in Fortune's list of the world's most powerful women in business. In 2021, O'Brien was 11th in Fast Company Queer 50 list. In 2022, she was 12th on the list.

Biography
A three-decade Apple veteran, her vice presidential responsibilities have expanded from Worldwide Sales and Operations, to people, and currently, to people and retail. O'Brien holds a Bachelor's Degree in Operations Management from Michigan State University and an MBA from San Jose State University.

References 

20th-century American businesspeople
21st-century American businesspeople
American businesspeople in retailing
American women chief executives
Apple Inc. executives
Women corporate executives
Michigan State University alumni
San Jose State University alumni
Living people
1966 births
20th-century American businesswomen
21st-century American businesswomen